Pioneer Cabin, also known as William A. Burgess House, is one of the oldest buildings in Colorado Springs, Colorado's Douglas Valley. It is on the National Register of Historic Places.

History
The cabin was built between 1871 and 1877 by William Alexander Burgess.

References

Houses on the National Register of Historic Places in Colorado
Colorado State Register of Historic Properties
Buildings and structures in Colorado Springs, Colorado
Houses in El Paso County, Colorado
National Register of Historic Places in Colorado Springs, Colorado